Laurel Griggs (June 28, 2006 – November 5, 2019) was an American child actress, primarily acting in Broadway theatre, and also appearing in films and on television, including two appearances in Saturday Night Live and a small part in the Woody Allen film Café Society.

Career 
Griggs' first appearance on Broadway was at the age of six as Polly in Cat on a Hot Tin Roof. She played Ivanka in the musical Once for a record-setting 17-month stint between 2013 and 2015. Her Broadway career was reported to have encompassed over a thousand performances. She also appeared on episodes of the television series Louie, Saturday Night Live, and Bubble Guppies.

Death 
Griggs died of an undiagnosed massive asthma attack on November 5, 2019, at Mount Sinai Hospital in Manhattan. She was 13 years old. Griggs was Jewish. She is buried at New Montefiore Cemetery. Her mother, Elizabeth Rivlin, and her father, Andrew Griggs, are among her survivors.

References

External links

 

2006 births
2019 deaths
American child actresses
Place of birth missing
American musical theatre actresses
Deaths from asthma
21st-century American actresses
Jewish American actresses
Burials at New Montefiore Cemetery
Actresses from New York City
21st-century American Jews